Cymindis medvedevi is a species of ground beetle in the subfamily Harpalinae. It was described by Kryzhanovskij & Emetz in 1973.

References

medvedevi
Beetles described in 1973